Märta Eleonora Tikkanen (born 3 April 1935) is a Swedish-speaking Finnish writer.

Biography 
Born in Helsinki, she has worked as a reporter for Hufvudstadsbladet from 1956 to 1961. She graduated from the University of Helsinki, Master of Arts in 1958 and received a Master of Philosophy in 1961. Tikkanen was married to writer Henrik Tikkanen. A film based on her book Manrape (Män kan inte våldtas, "Men Can't Be Raped"), directed by Jörn Donner, was released in 1978.

Bibliography
nu imorron (1970)
Ingenmansland (1972)
Vem bryr sig om Doris Mihailov (1974)
Män kan inte våldtas (1975)
Århundradets kärlekssaga (1978)
Mörkret som ger glädjen djup (1981)
Sofias egen bok (1982)
Rödluvan (1986)
Storfångaren (1989)
Arnaía kastad i havet (1992)
Bryta mot lagen (1992)
Personliga angelägenheter (1996)
Sofia vuxen med sitt MBD (1998)
Två (2004)
Emma & Uno - visst var det kärlek (2010)

Prizes
Nordic Women's Alternative Literature Prize (1979)
Finnish Bookseller's Thank You For the Book Prize (1979)
Finland's State Prize for the Dissemination of Knowledge (1983)
Swedish literary De Nios Grand Prize (1999)
Swedish Academy's Finland Prize (2002)
Finland's State Literary Prize (2011)

References 
 Biography at Rowohlt publishers 

Finnish writers
Finnish writers in Swedish
Writers from Helsinki
Finnish women writers
1935 births
Living people
Swedish women writers